Perplex City Stories is the planned second season of the alternate reality game Perplex City, run by Mind Candy. Although no plot has been revealed yet, the first wave of puzzle cards was released on March 1, 2007.

On June 1, 2007, it was announced via the main Perplex City Stories homepage that the game was being delayed for an indefinite amount of time, but would certainly be making a return in the future. The following is taken from the announcement:
At Mind Candy we've always believed that a less than perfect game is worse than no game at all. For this reason, we're holding off from launching Season Two for now.

We want to reassure you that this is not the end for Perplex City; we've invested far too much love, time, and energy in this to stop now.

The Perplex City Stories site is also being complemented by the new "Perplex City—We Love Puzzles" site, which features new user-submitted puzzles and flash games. The site also allows users to enter the solutions for both Season 1 and Season 2 puzzle cards, as well as keeps a total of the number of puzzles solved, including site puzzles and puzzle cards.

At the after-party of the first season, players were given "keys", fictional high-tech devices from the game, with codes allowing them to register for the new game. Players who ordered Season 2 cards from Firebox.com also received these keys. Those who attended the party were also give business cards sending them to VioletUnderground.com.

Plot 
On March 1, 2007, the site was updated with a video featuring Violet Kiteway—portrayed live, for the first time—and a news broadcast discussing a horrific murder in Perplex City. The on-scene reporter notes that bystanders were covered with blood. The news anchor who sees pictures of the scene faints at their sight. Violet finishes by asking players for help in solving the murder. This is expected to form the first re-playable 'episode' entitled The Missing Piece, and is due to begin in early June, 2007

On May 1, 2007, it was announced via the Developer's Blog that a "part of the ARG" would be made public within the next few days. ARGN, a news website for ARGs, later reported that this was to be a pre-game which was due to start on May 4, 2007.

Hot Water

On May 4, VioletUnderground.com launched, with Violet asking players to help her locate a leak in her new apartment building. This began the first, non-replayable, 'episode' of Perplex City Stories.

Through the new site's sections and posts following the solution of the puzzle, Violet revealed that, after her theft of The Receda Cube, many people sent her death threats, and she was forced to relocate to a new apartment building. She also introduced a new character, another tenant in her building named Gustaffsen. Gustaffsen is a scientist who was working on a new super-coolant, which was making the drips that Violet had noticed.

Gustaffsen and Cassia, one of the newer puzzle scribes at the Perplex City Academy, had informed Violet that their mail was being delayed, despite the Perplex City postal service guaranteeing delivery within five hours. By contacting an employee of the Perplex City Post, players gained access to a 'testing' area for the Post. After several experiments by players, it was discovered that post being delivered to the Apolyton Institute, a shadowy scientific organisation in the city.

A member of this Institute, who remains anonymous, contacted Violet to tell her that their mail had been vanishing for weeks, after the disappearance of technology for a "neural override". The plans for this technology were sent to the IP address of BBC Radio 1.

After coming into contact with a man named Paul Denchfield, players discovered that V (a.k.a. Cyrus Quinton), an agent of the Third Power organisation and a murderer, was planning to use the neural override to control the minds of the public at Radio 1's Big Weekend festival in Preston on the weekend of May 19 and May 20, 2007. The project was called "Frozen Indigo Angel", as these were the words needed to activate the override.

Several players won tickets to the event under the guise of being Third Power agents. At the festival, the players (with the assistance of Paul and groups of online players) had to find transmitters around the area in order to prevent the neural override. The players were successful, yet V escaped the festival grounds without being caught.

Differences from Season One 
 There will not be an underlying "treasure hunt" throughout the entire season
 The concept of "This Is Not A Game" will not be upheld
 The game will be created in replayable episodes

References

External links 
 Perplex City Stories Official Website
 Perplex City—We Love Puzzles
 Violet Underground blog
 Paul Denchfield's blog
 Season 2 Puzzle Cards

Alternate reality games